Athletics competitions at the 2014 Micronesian Games were held at the Pohnpei Track and Field in Palikir, Pohnpei, between July 21–24, 2014.

A total of 38 events were contested, 19 by men and 19 by women.

Medal summary
Medal winners and their results were published on the OAA webpage.

Men

Women

Medal table (unofficial)

Participation
According to an unofficial count, 142 athletes from 8 countries participated.

 (14)
 (18)
 (13)
 (5)
 (18)
 (25)
 (38)
 (11)

References

External links
Official webpage

Athletics at the Micronesian Games
Athletics in the Federated States of Micronesia
Micronesian Games
2014 in Federated States of Micronesia sport
International sports competitions hosted by the Federated States of Micronesia